Rasajeyna is a genus of parasitic alveolates in the phylum Apicomplexa. This genus has been little studied and not much is known about these protozoa.

History

This genus was created in 1977 by Beesley.

Taxonomy

There is one species in this genus, Rasajeyna nannyla.

Description

These protozoa infect the midgut of Tipula species (craneflies).

They are transmitted by the orofaecal route.

The oocyst is somewhat unusual with a double layered wall which surrounds up to 18 sporocysts. Each sporocyst contain only a single sporozoite.

Host records

Tipula paludosa
Tipula vittata

References

Apicomplexa genera
Monotypic SAR supergroup genera
Conoidasida